Pērse is a right tributary to the river Daugava in Latvia, flowing through Ērgļi, Pļaviņas and Koknese municipalities. The river crosses roads A6, P79, P80 and Riga - Krustpils railway line.
 
The river begins in Kārdeces forest in Sausnēja parish.

References

External links 

Rivers of Latvia